Rosemary Casals and Wendy Turnbull were the defending champions but lost in the quarterfinals to Mima Jaušovec and Kathy Jordan.

Martina Navratilova and Pam Shriver won in the final 6–7(4–7), 6–1, 6–3 against Rosalyn Fairbank and Candy Reynolds.

Seeds 
Champion seeds are indicated in bold text while text in italics indicates the round in which those seeds were eliminated.

Draw

Finals

Top half

Section 1

Section 2

Bottom half

Section 3

Section 4

External links 
1983 US Open – Women's draws and results at the International Tennis Federation

Women's Doubles
US Open (tennis) by year – Women's doubles
1983 in women's tennis
1983 in American women's sports